Children's University, is a state university in the city of Gandhinagar, Gujarat, India. Established in 2009, the university is affiliated with the University Grants Commission.

About
Children's University was founded by Narendra Modi (then Chief Minister of Gujarat) with the aim to conduct research in areas of overall development of children. University was founded vide "Children's University Act, 2009" and is affiliated with the University Grants Commission. The University conducts research, education, training and extension services for creating right environment and systems to facilitate development of children and is the only Children's University in India.

See also
 University Grants Commission
 Universities in India
 Education in India

References 

Universities in Gujarat
Gandhinagar
Educational institutions established in 2009
2009 establishments in Gujarat